The table below shows the motor vehicle fatality rate in the United States by year from 1899 through 2021. It excludes indirect car-related fatalities.

For 2016 specifically, National Highway Traffic Safety Administration (NHTSA) data shows 37,461 people were killed in 34,436 fatal motor vehicle crashes, an average of 102 per day.

In 2010, there were an estimated 5,419,000 crashes, 30,296 deadly, killing 32,999, and injuring 2,239,000. About 2,000 children under 16 die every year in traffic collisions. Records indicate that there were 3,613,732 motor vehicle fatalities in the United States from 1899 to 2013.

Although the number of deaths, and deaths relative to the total US population, declined over most of the previous two decades, the trend reversed in 2015 and continued to move upward in 2016. From 1979 to 2005, the number of deaths per year decreased 14.97% while the number of deaths per capita decreased by 35.46%. The 32,479 traffic fatalities in 2011 were the lowest in 62 years, since 1949. US motor death statistics reported by government only include those on public roads, and do not include parking lots, driveways, and private roads.

For more details, see Transportation safety in the United States.

Motor vehicle deaths in U.S. by year

Notes

References

Road transport-related lists
Road safety in the United States
Accidental deaths in the United States
Road incident deaths in the United States